The Cailly is a river in Normandy, France,  in length, flowing through the department of Seine-Maritime. It is a right tributary of the Seine.

Geography 
The Cailly has its source in the territory of the commune of Cailly. Taking a southward journey, it flows through Fontaine-le-Bourg, meeting its principal tributary, the Clérette at Montville. It then flows through Malaunay, Houlme, Notre-Dame-de-Bondeville, Maromme, Déville-lès-Rouen and finally Rouen where it joins the Seine on its right bank.

The average flow of the Cailly at Notre-Dame-de-Bondeville is 2.6 m³ / second.

History 
In the 18th and 19th centuries, the valley was filled with textile mills, which earned it the nickname la petite Manchester, (Little Manchester).

Bibliography 
Albert Hennetier, Aux sources normandes: Promenade au fil des rivières en Seine-Maritime, Ed. Bertout, Luneray, 2006

See also 
French water management scheme

References

Rivers of Normandy
Rivers of France
Rivers of Seine-Maritime